Amanda Jane "Mandy" Barker (née Smith, born 14 May 1972, in Ranfurly, New Zealand) is a former field hockey striker from New Zealand, who finished sixth with her national team at the 2000 Summer Olympics in Sydney. The forward, educated at St Hilda's College in Dunedin, played her first international against Japan for Otago in 1989, then played for The Black Sticks the next year against Great Britain. She was unable to play 1995 because of back problems that required surgery.

Smith was a member of the bronze medal winning team at the 1998 Commonwealth Games in Kuala Lumpur, and was one of the athletes involved in designing the NZ Olympic Team uniform. Smith was runner-up in Women's International Hockey Player of the Year Award 2000.

They have three daughters: Mia, Livvy, and Isla, and one son, Matteo.

References

External links
 

New Zealand female field hockey players
Olympic field hockey players of New Zealand
Field hockey players at the 1992 Summer Olympics
Field hockey players at the 2000 Summer Olympics
1972 births
Living people
Commonwealth Games bronze medallists for New Zealand
Field hockey players at the 1998 Commonwealth Games
People from Ranfurly, New Zealand
Commonwealth Games medallists in field hockey
Medallists at the 1998 Commonwealth Games